Celia Keenan-Bolger (born January 26, 1978) is an American actress and singer. She is known for portraying Scout Finch in the play To Kill a Mockingbird (2018), which earned her a Tony Award. She has also won three Drama Desk Awards and an Outer Critics Circle Award.

Early life
Keenan-Bolger was born in Detroit, Michigan, the eldest of three children. She has a sister, Maggie, and a brother, Andrew.

She trained as a youth at the Mosaic Youth Theatre of Detroit and the Detroit School of Arts High School. She also attended Interlochen Center for the Arts. She is a graduate of the University of Michigan's musical theatre performance program.

Career
Keenan-Bolger's regional credits include Johanna in Sweeney Todd: The Demon Barber of Fleet Street at the Kennedy Center Sondheim Celebration in 2002, along with productions at the Goodman Theatre, TheatreWorks and Sundance Theatre Program. In 2003, she originated the role of Clara Johnson in the pre-Broadway world premiere of the Craig Lucas/Adam Guettel musical The Light in the Piazza at Seattle's Intiman Theatre and Chicago's Goodman Theatre. Her Off-Broadway credits include Kindertransport, Little Fish and Summer of '42.

She appeared on the concept cast album of Bright Lights, Big City. She has sung in concert at the Lincoln Center American Songbook Series and at the Michigan Theatre with Audra McDonald. Keenan-Bolger performed as Martha in the 2005 The Secret Garden World AIDS Day benefit concert.

In 2005, Keenan-Bolger made her Broadway debut starring in William Finn's musical The 25th Annual Putnam County Spelling Bee, where she originated the role of Olive Ostrovsky. For this performance, she was nominated for a Tony Award for Best Featured Actress in a Musical. She had appeared in the musical from its beginning at the Barrington Stage Company (Pittsfield, Massachusetts) in July 2004, to the Off-Broadway production at the Second Stage Theatre in January through March 2005. With the original Broadway cast, she returned to The 25th Annual Putnam County Spelling Bee for a four-week limited engagement run at the Wadsworth Theatre in Los Angeles from May through June 2007.

She appeared on Broadway in the revival of Les Misérables as street waif Éponine from October 2006 to April 2007, for which she received a Drama Desk Award nomination. She also participated in a reading of Shrek The Musical as Princess Fiona in 2007.

Keenan-Bolger appeared in the Playwrights Horizons production of the new musical Saved with music and lyrics by Michael Friedman and a book by John Dempsey and Rinne Groff in 2008. She appeared in Bachelorette at the Second Stage Theatre and in Adam Bock's A Small Fire, opposite Michele Pawk and Reed Birney.

Keenan-Bolger starred as Mary Flynn in the Encores! production of Merrily We Roll Along, which played at the New York City Center from February 8 through 19, 2012.

In 2011, she starred in the New York Theatre Workshop production of Peter and the Starcatcher, a stage adaptation of the 2004 best-selling children's novel of a similar name. 
She reprised the role of Molly in the Broadway transfer production of Peter and the Starcatcher, which played at the Brooks Atkinson Theatre from March 28, 2012, through January 20, 2013. Keenan-Bolger received Drama Desk Award and Tony Award nominations for her performance.

Keenan-Bolger played Laura Wingfield in the American Repertory Theater production of The Glass Menagerie alongside Cherry Jones, Zachary Quinto and Brian J. Smith, from February 2, 2013, through March 17, 2013. Keenan-Bolger reprised her role in the production's Broadway transfer, which ran from September 5, 2013, through February 23, 2014, at the Booth Theatre. She received a third Tony Award nomination for her performance.

Keenan-Bolger starred in the Lincoln Center production of Sarah Ruhl's The Oldest Boy, which began performances at the Mitzi E. Newhouse Theater on October 9, 2014.

She participated in a reading of The Brave Little Toaster: The Musical as the titular character. Others involved included Carol Channing, reprising her role as the Ceiling Fan. In early 2015, she appeared in a live reading of Eric Carle's Animals, Animals for the Autistic Children's Trust in Bangor, Maine.

In 2016, Keenan-Bolger played Varya in the Roundabout Theatre Company production of The Cherry Orchard.

She starred on Broadway in To Kill a Mockingbird as Scout, which opened in December 2018 and closed in March 2020 due to the COVID-19 pandemic. She received a Tony Award for Featured Actress in a Play, a Drama Desk Award, an Outer Critics Circle Award, and a Drama League Award nomination for her performance. Keenan-Bolger reprised her role when the Broadway production reopened in October 2021 and played her final performance on January 2, 2022.

In November 2020, Keenan-Bolger was announced as part of the cast of HBO's new series The Gilded Age. She played Mrs. Bruce in the first season of the show, and it has been announced that she will be returning as a series regular for season 2, being filmed in 2022.

Personal life 
Keenan-Bolger has been married to actor John Ellison Conlee since 2010. They have a son, born in 2015.

Credits

Filmography

Wolverine: The Long Night, Agent Sally Pierce, 2018 (scripted podcast)

Theatre

Awards and nominations

References

External links
 
 
  (archive)
  (archive)

American stage actresses
University of Michigan School of Music, Theatre & Dance alumni
Actresses from Detroit
Actresses from Michigan
American musical theatre actresses
Living people
Tony Award winners
Theatre World Award winners
21st-century American women
1978 births